The St. Mary's Catholic Church in Medora, North Dakota was built in 1884 by Peter Book, a builder who also constructed the Von Hoffman House.  It was listed on the National Register of Historic Places in 1977.

A metal plate on the church states that it was built by the Marquise de Mores.  She was the wife of the Marquis de Mores.

References

Churches on the National Register of Historic Places in North Dakota
Roman Catholic churches completed in 1884
Churches in the Roman Catholic Diocese of Bismarck
National Register of Historic Places in Billings County, North Dakota
19th-century Roman Catholic church buildings in the United States
1884 establishments in Dakota Territory